Where Forever Begins may refer to:

Where Forever Begins (Neal McCoy album), 1992
Where Forever Begins (Ken Mellons album), 1995